This is a list of video game companies originating from Sweden.

Notable companies 

 10 Chambers Collective KB
 Aftnareld
 AmberWing
 Armchair Developers
 Arrowhead Game Studios
 Atod
 Aurora Punks (collective)
 Limit Break Studio 
 LootLocker (Backend tools)
 Pixadome Games
 Wimasima
 Avalanche Studios
 Expansive Worlds
 Systemic Reaction
 Axolot Games
 Bear Twigs
 Blamorama Games AB
 Caspian Interactive
 Clifftop Games AB
 Cockroach Inc.
 Cresthelm Studios
 Daydream Software
 Deadtoast Entertainment
 Dennaton Games
 Devm Games
 Doomlord Interactive AB
 DoubleMoose Games
 EA DICE
 Embracer Group
 Amplifier Game Invest (Some of its devs are Swedish)
 A Creative Endeavor
 Fall Damage Studio
 Frame Break
 Green Tile Digital
 Kavalri Games
 Neon Giant
 Palindrome Interactive
 Plucky Bytes
 River End Games
 Tarsier Studios
 Coffee Stain Holding
 Box Dragon
 Coffee Stain Studios (4 branches)
 Easy Trigger
 Lavapotion
 Embracer Freemode
 Bitwave Games
 Clear River Games (publisher)
 Game Outlet Europe (distributor)

 Enad Global 7
 Toadman Interactive (Also co-devs)
 Experiment 101
 Faravid Interactive
 Fast Travel Games
 Fatshark
 FeWes Games
 Friendly Fire Games
 Frojo Apps
 Frictional Games
 Ghost Games
 Grenaa Games
 GRIN
 Hazelight Studios
 HolmCom
 Illwinter Game Design
 Image & Form
 Iron Gate Studio
 Jadestone Group
 Keepsake Games AB (Also co-devs)
 King
 Landfall Games
 Legendo Entertainment (Ex-Iridon Interactive)
 Let It Roll AB
 Landfall Games
 Lutra Interactive
 MachineGames
 Massive Entertainment
 Might and Delight
 MindArk
 Mirage Game Studios
 Mojang
 Nifflas
 Overflow Games
 Paradox Development Studio
 Philisophic Games
 Pieces Interactive
 Pixleon Games
 Planeshift Interactive
 Pugstorm Game Studios
 Redikod
 Resolution Games
 Ringtail Games
 SetShape Studio
 Sharkmob
 Silkworm Games
 SimBin Studios
 Simogo
 Skygoblin
 Solid Core
 SolidIcon
 Southend Interactive
 Starbreeze Studios
 Overkill Software
 Star Stable Entertainment
 Stunlock Studios
 Sutur Studio
 Team Psykskallar
 The Bearded Ladies Consulting
 The Outsiders
 Thunderful Development AB
 Triassic Games AB (Offices in Sweden, Germany & Poland)
 Tuxedo Labs
 Tymedust Games
 Wishfully Studios
 Wonderscope AB
 Yarnot Games
 Zoink
 Zordix AB
 Dimfrost Studio

Misc games 

 Gellyberry Studios (Online games)
 Stillfront Group (Holding group. Mobile & online games.)
 Coldwood Interactive
 Power Challenge AB

Defunct companies 

 Amuze (Founded 1996. Defunct 2005.)
 Bonnier Multimedia AB (Founded 1993. Defunct 2002.)
 Colossai Studios AB (Founded 2005. Website down early 2014.)
 ComputerHouse GBG AB (Founded 1996. Defunct 2001.)
 Daydream Software (Swedish dev. Founded 1994. Defunct 2004. Different to later German or Spanish dev 'Daydream Software SLL'.)
 Lockpick Entertainment (Founded 2004. Defunct 2011. Online game & co-development.)
 Meqon Research AB (Founded 2002. Acquired by AGEIA Technologies in 2005. Physics engine middleware.)
 Refraction Games (Founded 1998. Merged with DICE in 2000.)
 Termite Games (Ex-Insomnia Software in 1997 to 2000. Acquired by Dutch publisher, Project 3 Interactive in 2002. Defunct 2006.)
 Unique Development Studios AB (Founded 1993. Defunct 2004. Games.)

Notable publishers 

 Aurora Punks
 Killmonday Games AB
 PAN Vision AB (Ex-PAN Interactive from 1998 till 2001. Publisher & distributor.)
 Paradox Interactive
 Raw Fury
 Thunderful Publishing AB

Publisher & developer firms 

 5 Fortress (Online games)
 Angry Demon Studio
 Diax Arts (Ex-Diax Game AB)
 Early Morning Studio
 Echo Entertainment
 Embark Studios (Online games)
 Gamatron AB
 Hörberg Productions
 Snowprint Studios AB (Online games)
 Something We Made

Defunct publishers 

 Software of Sweden (Founded 1986. Inactive after 1998. Publisher & dev.)

See also 
 Video games in Sweden
 List of video game companies
 Lists of video games
 Video game developer
 Video game publisher

Notes

References

External links
 Swedish game developers Goodgame website (archived)
 Positive turnover for Swedish game developers MCV
 Swedish Games Industry Formed As Unified Trade Body Gamasutra
 Dataspelsbranschen - Swedish Games Industry Swedish games industry trade organisation
 East Sweden Game (Community, workplace and business incubator for developers of computer games and digital experiences. Registry of ~50 individual companies & 20+ member companies. Games in development page has companies' names.)
 Game Developers Index page (By Swedish Games Industry. Webpage has annual Swedish game devs index reports starting from 2008 onward. 667 companies in 2021 report!)
 European Games Developer Federation (Additional links to recent index reports as seen in above website)

Video game
Video gaming in Sweden